The Vandergrift Pioneers were a minor league baseball team based in Vandergrift, Pennsylvania from 1947 until 1950. The team played in the Middle Atlantic League and won the league title in 1947. The club was also a class-C affiliate of the Philadelphia Phillies throughout its existence. The Pioneers formally disbanded on July 20, 1950.

Year-by-year record

Baseball teams established in 1947
Baseball teams disestablished in 1950
Defunct minor league baseball teams
Defunct baseball teams in Pennsylvania
Philadelphia Phillies minor league affiliates
1947 establishments in Pennsylvania
1950 disestablishments in Pennsylvania
Vandergrift, Pennsylvania
Middle Atlantic League teams